Huntsville School District (formally Huntsville School District 1) is a public school district based in Huntsville, Madison County, Arkansas. The school district is the 3rd largest school district by area served, encompassing 747 square miles. This district and its schools are accredited by AdvancED.

As of the 2021–2022 school year, the district's 6 schools have a total enrollment of 2,228 students.

In addition to Huntsville, within Madison County, the district includes Hindsville, St. Paul, and Wesley. The district extends into Franklin County.

Merger  
On July 1, 2004, the St. Paul School District was merged into the Huntsville School District.

List of Schools

Secondary education 
The Huntsville School District provides education programs for students in two facilities.

 Huntsville High School–serving students in grades 9-12
 St. Paul High School–serving students in grades 7-12

Middle school 
The district operates two middle schools.

 Huntsville Middle School–serving students in grades 6-8
 St. Paul Elementary–serving students in grades K-6

Elementary and early childhood education 
Three educational facilities make up the district's elementary and early childhood programs

 Watson Primary School–serving students in grades K-2
 Huntsville Intermediate School–serving students in grades 3-5
 St. Paul Elementary–serving students in grades K-6

Administration
The Huntsville School District Board of Education consists of seven members. The members of the board meet regularly on the second Monday of each month at 7 pm Central Time in the Huntsville School District Administration Building and district schools.

References

External links
 

Education in Madison County, Arkansas
Education in Franklin County, Arkansas
School districts in Arkansas